Vattakkalvalasu is a village in Tamil Nadu, India. It has the town panchayat office for  Gandhi Garden in Kilambadi, Erode district. The major clans is vaalai kattai valavu P.P.Subramaniyam pambagoundan palayam. Ps.karthickkannan.

The village is located 25 kilometers from Erode, 15 kilometers from Kodumudi and 42 kilometers from Karur. The Kalingarayan Canal passes through the village.

The Malayampalayam Police station is located half a kilometre from the village.

There is a co-operative milk society in the village.

Villages in Erode district